This is a list of the seasons played by JS Saoura from 2008 when the club first entered a league competition to the most recent seasons. The club's achievements in all major national and international competitions as well as the top scorers are listed. Top scorers in bold were also top scorers of Ligue 1. The list is separated into three parts, coinciding with the three major episodes of Algerian football:

History 
The club formed on June 10, 1968, following the merger of the JSB (Jeunesse Sportive Bécharienne) and the ESD (Étoile du Sud de Debdaba) The club was re-established in September 2008 in the municipality of Méridja and was called as Jeunesse Sportive de la Saoura. The club achieved promotion four times in a row to reach in the 2012–13 season to the Algerian Ligue Professionnelle 1 as the first club from the southwest, and with financing from Entreprise Nationale de Forage (ENAFOR) a firm of the petroleum company Sonatrach. the team started to impose itself to achieve in the 2015–16 season the runner-up of the Ligue Professionnelle 1 and two seasons later they achieved the same achievement.

Seasons

Key 

Key to league record:
P = Played
W = Games won
D = Games drawn
L = Games lost
GF = Goals for
GA = Goals against
Pts = Points
Pos = Final position

Key to divisions:
1 = Ligue 1
2 = Ligue 2
3 = DNA
4 = Inter-Régions Division
5 = Régionale II

Key to rounds:
DNE = Did not enter
Grp = Group stage
R1 = First Round
R2 = Second Round
R32 = Round of 32

R16 = Round of 16
QF = Quarter-finals
SF = Semi-finals
RU = Runners-up
W = Winners

Division shown in bold to indicate a change in division.
Top scorers shown in bold are players who were also top scorers in their division that season.

Transfers

List of JS Saoura players hat-tricks
Position key:
GK – Goalkeeper;
DF – Defender;
MF – Midfielder;
FW – Forward;
4 – Player scored four goals;
* – The home team

Notes

References

Algerian football club seasons by club